The PHA Foundation, short form for Pakistan Housing Authority Foundation, is a government body based in Islamabad, Pakistan, with offices in Lahore and Karachi.  The PHA Foundation controls and helps in building housing societies and communities in modern ways.  It was established on May 18, 1999 to help improving housings.  This organization is controlled by the Ministry of Housing and Works (Pakistan) of which MAULANA ABDUL WASAY is serving as federal minister.

References

External links
 

1999 establishments in Pakistan
Government agencies established in 1999
Government-owned companies of Pakistan
Organisations based in Islamabad
Pakistan federal departments and agencies
Housing in Pakistan
Housing organizations